My Crazy Ex is an American reality storytelling television series on LMN. This show tells the true stories of people who imagine themselves lucky in love, but their relationships eventually spiral out of control, and they find themselves in desperate search of escape. It can be difficult to see the difference between being in love or being given attention by a person who is habitually charming.

Episodes

Season 1 (2014–15)

Season 2 (2015–16)

Season 3 (2016)

Special (2016)

Season 4 (2016–17)

Season 5 (2018)

References

External links 
 
 

2010s American reality television series
2014 American television series debuts
2018 American television series endings
2010s American comedy-drama television series
American dating and relationship reality television series
Television series featuring reenactments
Storytelling television shows
English-language television shows